Ali Srour (born 11 June 1994) is a Norwegian professional boxer of Lebanese descent. As an amateur, he has been Norwegian champion and Nordic champion several times.

After a long lay off, Ali lost in his last Nordic Championship resulting with a silver medal. Ali has also competed in the European Youth Championship, ending with a loss to Gabil Mamedov from Russia who took silver medal.

Ali is known for his unusual boxing style and cocky persona. Also, he is characterized by his highly athletic and hard-hitting boxing style, and formidable one-punch knockout power.

Early life 
Ali was born in 1994 in Tønsberg, Norway to Lebanese parents. He started boxing when he was 12 years old at the TK boxing club in his hometown of Tønsberg. At the age of 12, he started his amateur career, and has become national junior champion eight times, and Scandinavian junior champion twice.

Professional career 
Ali was supposed to box in the undercard to Cecilia Brækhus in Oslofjord Convention Center, but the opponent resigned. Afterwards, Ali traveled to South America and started his professional career there. He has been living in Latin America since then, and is currently residing in Guadalajara, Mexico.

Professional boxing record

References

External links 
 
 Ali Srour on London Live
 Ali Srour and Cecilia Brækhus TB
 Ali Srour suspended after National Championship. TB
 Ali Srour becomes Scandinavian Champion. TB
 Ali Srour in European Championship. AIBA
 Ali Srour the new face of boxing in Norway
 Ali Srour unbeaten national champion. TB
 

Living people
1994 births
Featherweight boxers
Southpaw boxers
Norwegian male boxers
Norwegian Muslims
Norwegian people of Lebanese descent
Sportspeople of Lebanese descent
Sportspeople from Tønsberg